Tafna Beni Saf is a volcanic field in Algeria. It was active during the Pleistocene until 820,000 years ago, and is part of the larger Oranie volcanic field.

References 

Pleistocene volcanoes
Volcanoes of Algeria
Volcanic fields